Folwark  (German Fallwark) is a village in the administrative district of Gmina Prószków, within Opole County, Opole Voivodeship, in south-western Poland.

References

Folwark